Von Bezold may refer to:
 Albert von Bezold (1836–1868), German physiologist
 Wilhelm von Bezold (1837–1907), German physicist

See also 
 Bezold